Gregor Ewen Cameron (born 11 January 1964) is a former New Zealand athlete who represented his country at the 1990 Commonwealth Games.

Early life and family
Cameron was born in Dunedin on 11 January 1964, the son of Linda and Clive Cameron, and educated at East Otago High School. He went on to study at the University of Waikato, completing a Bachelor of Social Sciences in 1986, and Hamilton Teachers' College, where he was awarded a Diploma of Teaching in 1988.

In 1988, Cameron married Karenza de Silva.

Athletics
Cameron won the New Zealand national men's 3000 m steeplechase title in 1986 and 1988. He represented New Zealand in the 3000 m steeplechase at the 1990 Commonwealth Games in Auckland. He finished ninth, recording a time of 8:42.08.

In 1990, Cameron was awarded the New Zealand 1990 Commemoration Medal.

References

1964 births
Living people
Athletes from Dunedin
People educated at East Otago High School
University of Waikato alumni
New Zealand male middle-distance runners
New Zealand male steeplechase runners
Athletes (track and field) at the 1990 Commonwealth Games
Commonwealth Games competitors for New Zealand